Ishmael Tetteh Aryeetey is a Ghanaian politician and a Chief Executive. He served as a member of parliament in the  First Parliament of the Fourth Republic of Ghana for the Odododiodoo constituency in the Greater Accra region of Ghana.

Early life and education 
Tetteh Aryeetey was born on 9 August 1950. He attended Dundee University and London School of Economics where he obtained respectively a Bachelor of Science in Mathematics and a Master of Science in Computer Science.

Politics 
Tetteh Aryeetey was elected as a member of the First Parliament of the Fourth Republic of Ghana during the 1992 Ghanaian parliamentary election. He contested and won the Odododiodoo seat on the ticket of the National Democratic Congress. He was succeeded by Nii Okaidja Adamafio, who was the Member of Parliament for Odododiodoo constituency in the Second Parliament of the Fourth Republic of Ghana.

Career 
During an Inauguration in Accra Ishmael Tetteh Aryeetey as a Former Accra Metropolitan Chief Executive urged students to have much time for mathematics and present to the public ''SoftMaths'' an ICT tool for Mathematics and appealed parents to purchase the app for their children.

During his career, he participated to a survey named ''EXTENDING TAM WITH SOCIAL NORM TO MODEL STUDENTS' INTENTIONS TO ADOPT ICT''

Personal life 
He is a Christian.

References 

1950 births
Living people
Ghanaian MPs 1993–1997
National Democratic Congress (Ghana) politicians
Alumni of the University of Dundee
Ghanaian business executives
Alumni of the London School of Economics
Ghanaian chief executives
People from Greater Accra Region
21st-century Ghanaian politicians